Orehovlje is a settlement on the right bank of the Kokra River in the Municipality of Kranj in the Upper Carniola region of Slovenia.

Name
Like similar place names in Slovenia (e.g., Orehovica, Orehovec, Orešje, etc.), the name Orehovlje is based on the root oreh 'walnut', thus referring to the local vegetation.

References

External links

Orehovlje on Geopedia

Populated places in the City Municipality of Kranj